Ivan James Sharp (3 August 1909 – 24 March 1989) was an Australian rules footballer who played with Fitzroy in the Victorian Football League (VFL).

Sharp later served in the Australian Army during World War II.

Notes

External links 

1909 births
1989 deaths
Australian rules footballers from Melbourne
Fitzroy Football Club players
People from Ivanhoe, Victoria
Australian Army personnel of World War II
Military personnel from Melbourne